cAMP-dependent protein kinase inhibitor alpha is a protein that in humans is encoded by the PKIA gene.

The protein encoded by this gene is a member of the cAMP-dependent protein kinase (PKA) inhibitor family. This protein was demonstrated to interact with and inhibit the activities of both C alpha and C beta catalytic subunits of the PKA. Alternatively spliced transcript variants encoding the same protein have been reported.

References

Further reading